James Terry may refer to:
 James Terry (officer of arms), Irish officer of arms
 James Terry (fighter), American mixed martial artist
 James L. Terry, United States Army general
 James Terry (basketball), American-Israeli basketball player